Executions by ISIS refers here to killing by beheading, immolation, shooting or other means of military and civilian people (such as captives and "criminals") by the Islamic State of Iraq and the Levant (ISIL). ISIL has released a number of propaganda/publicity videos of beheadings or shootings of captives. Houtat Sulūk is reported to be a mass grave.

Military captives
By June 2014, according to United Nations reports, ISIL had killed hundreds of prisoners of war and over 1,000 civilians.  Specific incidents involving the killing of military prisoners including the mass killing of up to 250 Syrian Army soldiers near Tabqa Air base, and killings that took place in Camp Speicher (1,095–1,700 Iraqi soldiers shot and "thousands" more "missing") and the Shaer gas field (200 Syrian soldiers shot). ISIL was reported to have beheaded about 100 foreign fighters as deserters who tried to leave Raqqa.

Muath al-Kasasbeh, a Royal Jordanian Air Force pilot whose F-16 fighter aircraft crashed near Raqqa, Syria, on 24 December 2014 during the international military intervention against ISIL, was captured by ISIL, and on 3 February 2015 released a video showing al-Kasasbeh being burned to death while trapped inside a cage.

Civilian captives
Among the known killings of religious and minority group civilians carried out by ISIL are those in the villages and towns of Qiiniyeh (70–90 Yazidis killed), Hardan (60 Yazidis killed), Sinjar (200–500 Yazidis killed), Ramadi Jabal (60–70 Yazidis killed), Dohula (50 Yazidis killed), Khana Sor (100 Yazidis killed), Hardan (250–300 Yazidis killed), al-Shamal (dozens of Yazidis killed), Kocho (400 Yazidis killed and 1,000 abducted), Jadala (14 Yadizis killed) and Beshir (700 Shia Turkmen killed), and others committed near Mosul (670 Shia inmates of the Badush prison killed), and in Tal Afar prison, Iraq (205 Yazidis killed for refusing conversion).

Journalists
ISIL has tortured and murdered both local and foreign journalists, creating what Reporters Without Borders calls "news blackholes" in areas controlled by ISIL. ISIL fighters have reportedly been given written directions to kill or capture journalists.

 James Wright Foley (October 18, 1973 August 19, 2014) was an American freelance journalist and photojournalist of the Syrian Civil War when he was abducted on November 22, 2012, in northwestern Syria. Foley was the first American citizen to be killed by "Jihadi John". James Foley's beheading by ISIL received wide condemnation in the United States.
Steven Joel Sotloff (May 11, 1983 –  September 2, 2014) was an Israeli-American journalist for Time magazine and The Jerusalem Post, although the Post disavowed any relationship once Sotloff's life was threatened. In 2013, he was kidnapped in Aleppo, Syria, and was held captive by Islamic militants. On September 2, 2014, a video was released purporting to show "Jihadi John" beheading Steven Sotloff.
 On January 8, 2015, ISIL members in Libya claimed to have executed Tunisian journalists Sofiene Chourabi and Nadhir Ktari who disappeared in September 2014.  
 In January 2015 ISIL threatened to kill two Japanese hostages, Kenji Goto Jogo, a journalist, and Haruna Yukawa, a military company operator, unless a ransom of 200 million USD is paid. By the end of the month, the group released another video of the beheading of Goto, in which Jihadi John proclaimed to Japanese prime minister Shinzō Abe "because of your reckless decision to take part in an unwinnable war, this knife will not only slaughter Kenji, but will also carry on and cause carnage wherever your people are found. So let the nightmare for Japan begin."

Aid workers
ISIL has also murdered aid workers.

David Haines (May 9, 1970 –  September 13, 2014) was abducted in March 2013 by ISIL while working in Syria for the humanitarian aid group Agency for Technical Cooperation and Development assessing the Atmeh refugee camp near the Turkish border and the Syrian province of Idlib.  A video of the lead-up and aftermath of David Haines' beheading, entitled "A Message to the Allies of America", was released by ISIL on September 13, 2014.
Hervé Gourdel (September 12, 1959 –  September 24, 2014) was a French citizen and mountaineering guide. Gourdel was kidnapped on September 21, 2014, while hiking in the Djurdjura National Park in Algeria.  The following day, an at the time recently formed ISIL affiliate in Algeria, Jund al-Khilafah, released a video which showed Hervé Gourdel being held hostage. The group threatened to kill Gourdel if the French government continued to conduct airstrikes against ISIL. On September 24, they carried through on threats to behead him after a 24-hour deadline passed. The beheading was captured in a video titled "A Message of Blood for French Government."
Alan Henning (August 15, 1967 –  October 3, 2014) was a British humanitarian aid worker. Henning was the fourth Western hostage killed by ISIL. Henning was captured during ISIL's occupation of the Syrian city of Al-Dana in December 2013, where he was helping with humanitarian relief. The British Foreign Office withheld news of Henning's capture while they attempted to negotiate his release. Alan Henning was shown at the end of David Haines's beheading video, released on September 13, 2014, and referred to by "Jihadi John" as the next victim. A video of Henning's beheading was released by ISIL on October 3, 2014.
Peter Edward Kassig (February 19, 1988 – 2014), also known by the name Abdul-Rahman Kassig which he assumed in captivity, was 26 years old at the time he was beheaded. He was the adopted child of Ed, a school teacher, and Paula Kassig, a nurse. On October 1, 2013, as he was on his way to Deir Ezzour in eastern Syria to deliver food and medical supplies to refugees, Kassig was taken captive by ISIL. While in captivity, Kassig – formerly a Methodist – converted to Islam and changed his name to Abdul-Rahman Kassig, sometime between October and December 2013. On October 3, 2014, his parents released a video in which they stressed that his conversion to Islam was not forced, and that his path to conversion began before he was taken captive. On November 16, 2014, ISIL posted a video showing "Jihadi John" standing over a severed human head. The beheading itself was not shown in the video. The White House later confirmed the person killed was Kassig. 
 ISIL claimed that U.S. hostage Kayla Mueller was killed in the Jordanian airstrike on Raqqa on 5 February 2015. However, some experts believe that she may have been killed before the date of the video's release, in order for ISIL to try to drive a wedge between the U.S. and Jordan by blaming her death on the Jordanian airstrikes. Shortly thereafter President Obama confirmed the death of Mueller by ISIL.
 On November 19, 2015, Chinese national Fan Jinghui (樊京辉) and Norwegian national Ole Johan Grimsgaard-Ofstad were murdered by being shot by ISIL, and pictures were released in ISIL's magazine Dabiq.

See also
ISIL beheading incidents
Genocide of Christians by the Islamic State
Genocide of Yazidis by ISIL
Persecution of Shias by ISIL
Abu Azrael

References

 
Prisoner of war massacres